The Bulgarian team at the 2011 World Championships in Athletics held in Daegu, South Korea included seven athletes led by sprinter Ivet Lalova.

Results

Men

Women

References

External links
Official local organising committee website
Official IAAF competition website

Nations at the 2011 World Championships in Athletics
World Championships in Athletics
2011